David Padilla Arancibia (13 August 1927 – 25 September 2016) was a Bolivian general who served as the 53rd president of Bolivia from 1978 to 1979. 

A native of Sucre, Padilla was born on 13 August 1927. Joining the armed forces, he rose to the post of Commander of the Army. He was serving in that capacity when he deposed the also de facto government of General Juan Pereda on 24 November 1978. Pereda had taken the presidency in July of the same year simply because it was available to him, many military leaders having grown tired of the constant manipulations of dictator Hugo Banzer for his personal political ends. Padilla, in contrast, came to power as the leader of a group of democratically oriented officers committed to returning the country to democratic rule in as short a period of time as possible. His goal was simple: to transfer power to whoever won the upcoming presidential elections and effect a retreat of the military to its barracks and posts of operation, where they belonged. For this reason, Padilla was remarkably popular during his short (nine-month) stay at the Palacio Quemado.

The general election of 1 July 1979, on the other hand, turned out to be a fiasco. The leftist candidate Hernán Siles finished first at the polls, but without attaining the 50% majority necessary for direct election. Thus, it was left to Congress to determine the next Chief Executive, as stipulated in the Constitution. To the surprise of many, Congress could not agree on any candidate, no matter how many votes were taken. Positions hardened, and no solution seemed possible, until an alternative was offered in the form of the President of the Senate, Wálter Guevara, who was named President for one year pending the calling of new elections in 1980. Padilla duly transferred power to Guevara on 8 August 1979, as he had promised he would. He left the governing palace as an almost universally respected former de facto military leader — a rarity indeed in the history of Bolivia.

Padilla died in La Paz on 25 September 2016, at the age of 89.

See also
 Cabinet of David Padilla

References

1927 births
2016 deaths
20th-century Bolivian politicians
Bolivian generals
Leaders who took power by coup
Military College of the Army alumni
People from Sucre
Presidents of Bolivia